Alloiodoris lanuginata is a species of sea slug or dorid nudibranch, a marine gastropod mollusk in the family Discodorididae.

Distribution 
This species is endemic to New Zealand.

Description 
Alloiodoris lanuginata is a dorid nudibranch with a velvet surface. It is beige or brown in colour with scattered dark brown spots.

References

Discodorididae
Gastropods described in 1877
Taxa named by Phineas S. Abraham
Endemic fauna of New Zealand
Endemic molluscs of New Zealand